Angel Metodiev Stoyanov (born January 28, 1967, in Sofia) is a retired boxer from Bulgaria, who competed for his native country at the 1988 Summer Olympics in Seoul, South Korea. There he was defeated in the second round of the Men's Light Middleweight Division (– 71 kg) by East Germany's Torsten Schmitz.

References
 

1967 births
Living people
Welterweight boxers
Light-middleweight boxers
Olympic boxers of Bulgaria
Boxers at the 1988 Summer Olympics
Sportspeople from Sofia
Bulgarian male boxers